A list of films produced by the Bollywood, film industry based in Mumbai in 1981.

Top-grossing films
The top ten grossing films at the Indian Box Office in 
1981:

Films

References

External links
 Bollywood films of 1981 at the Internet Movie Database

1981
Bollywood
Films, Bollywood